Troglochares is a Neotropical genus of water scavenger beetle in the family Hydrophilidae represented by one described species known from caves in Ecuador.

Taxonomy 
The genus Troglochares belongs in the subfamily Acidocerinae. It was described for the first time by Paul Spangler in 1981 to accommodate an eyeless species from Los Tayos Cave in Morona-Santiago Province, Ecuador.

Description 
Small beetles (1.9 mm), smooth and shiny dorsally, yellowish-brown in coloration, with moderately long maxillary palps. The most salient characteristic of the genus is the lack of eyes. A complete diagnosis was presented by Girón and Short.

Habitat 
Troglochares ashmolei is the only acidocerine species known to occur in cavernicolous habitats.

Species 

 Troglochares ashmolei Spangler, 1981

References 

Hydrophilidae
Insects of South America
Insects described in 1981
Monotypic beetle genera